Serengeti-Dorobo (a nonce name) is an obscure "Dorobo" language, a few words of which were recorded in the late 19th century by Oscar Baumann. From the little data available, the language is not obviously related to any other, though the numeral system is Nilotic. It is not the only "Dorobo" language formerly spoken in the Serengeti.

Vocabulary
A few paragraphs were recorded by Baumann (1894, p. 366), but without any word-by-word translations.

Numerals are as follows. Most resemble those of neighboring Nilotic languages. 
1 napu (kinavéta napó 'one cattle') [cf. Maasai fem. nabo]
2 ennya [cf. Datooga iyeny, Omotik ainia]
3 uni [cf. Maasai fem. uni]
4 ongwan [cf. Maasai fem. ongwan, Datooga, Okiek angwan]
5 mot [cf. Datooga mut, Okiek mʊʊt, Omotik moot]
6 lei [cf. Datooga la, Okiek ile, Maasai ilɛ, Omotik lai]
7 oner
8 sissie [cf. Datooga sis]
9 naudó [cf. Okiek naudo, Maasai fem. naaudo]
10 gaget
15 gaget aχ mot
20 tegenos [cf. Okiek, Maasai tikitam]
30 tegenos aχ gaget

See also
 Omaio language

Notes 

 Oscar Baumann (Berlin, 1894), Durch Massailand zur Nilquelle. Reisen und Forschungen der Massai-Expedition des deutschen Antisklaverei-Komite in den Jahren 1891–1893

Languages of Tanzania
Unclassified languages of Africa
Languages extinct in the 20th century
Dorobo